Aman Deep (born 16 February 1986) is an Austrian cricketer. He played for Austria in the 2011 ICC European T20 Championship Division One tournament.

References

1986 births
Living people
Austrian cricketers
People from Fazilka district